Ibrahim Uwizeye (born 1972) is a Burundian politician, currently the Minister of Hydraulics, Energy and Mines in Burundi. He was appointed by President Évariste Ndayishimiye in June 2020.

Background and education 
Uwizeye was born in 1972 in Kirundo Province. He has a Diploma in Industrial Engineering in Planning and Urbanism from the University of Burundi.

Career 
Ibrahim Uwizeye served as a Construction Engineer in private companies before he went in to politics. In 2006, Uwizeye served as the Head of the North Office of Town Planning and Housing and later became the Director of Urban management. Thereafter, he was appointed Deputy for two legislatures. From 2020 to 2015, Uwizeye was a Secretary of the Standing Committee on Agriculture and Livestock, Environment and Communal Development.

References 

1972 births
Government ministers of Burundi
University of Burundi alumni
Living people